Freeland is a surname. Notable people with the surname include:

Adam Freeland (born 1973), English music producer and DJ
Blake Freeland (born 2000), American football player
Chris Freeland (born 1969), American politician
Chrystia Freeland (born 1968), Canadian author and politician
Cynthia Freeland, American philosopher of art
Don Freeland (1925–2007), American race car driver
Ewing Y. Freeland (1887–1953), American football and baseball player
Ian Freeland (1912–1979), British Army lieutenant-general
Joel Freeland (born 1987), English basketball player
Kyle Freeland (born 1993), American baseball player
Martin Freeland, British record producer
Richard M. Freeland (born 1941), American academic administrator

Surnames
English-language surnames
Surnames of English origin
Surnames of British Isles origin